Thomas Holdstock (10 August 1894 – 28 August 1970) was a South African boxer. He competed in the men's light heavyweight event at the 1920 Summer Olympics. At the 1920 Summer Olympics, he defeated Johan Clementz of Norway, before losing to Eddie Eagan of the United States.

References

External links
 

1894 births
1970 deaths
Light-heavyweight boxers
South African male boxers
Olympic boxers of South Africa
Boxers at the 1920 Summer Olympics
Place of birth missing